Finsterwolde is a village in the Dutch province of Groningen, about 7 km northeast of the city of Winschoten. Finsterwolde was a separate municipality until 1990, when it was merged with Beerta into Reiderland. In 2010 Reiderland merged into the municipality Oldambt. The old municipality of Finsterwolde included six small nearby or connecting settlements. These are also taken into account in the population estimate of 2008, without which the actual population, purely based on the centre and new developments, would be 1250. The village is known for the Galery Waalkens.

History
The town was named "Little Moscow" by Time magazine in 1950, because communists have always had the majority of the votes since 1933.

Born in Finsterwolde
Albert Waalkens (1920-2007), Dutch farmer and gallery owner
Arie Haan (1948), Dutch footballer and coach

Gallery

References

External links

Former municipalities of Groningen (province)
Oldambt (municipality)
Populated places in Groningen (province)